Daviesia aphylla is a species of flowering plant in the family Fabaceae and is endemic to the south-west of Western Australia. It is an erect, bushy shrub with glabrous foliage, up to six sharply-pointed phyllodes on each branchlet, and orange-red and yellow flowers.

Description

Taxonomy and naming
Daviesia aphylla was first formally described in 1864 by George Bentham in Flora Australiensis from and unpublished description by Ferdinand von Mueller from specimens collected near the Oldfield River by George Maxwell. The specific epithet (aphylla) means "without leaves".

Distribution and habitat
This species of pea grows in heath, woodland or mallee from the wheatbelt and Goldfields–Esperance regions of Western Australia through the Murray Mallee districts of South Australia, almost as far east as the Victorian border.

Conservation status
Daviesia aphylla is classified as "not threatened" by the Government of Western Australia Department of Biodiversity, Conservation and Attractions.

References

aphylla
Eudicots of Western Australia
Plants described in 1864
Taxa named by George Bentham